Niabella ginsenosidivorans is a Gram-negative, strictly aerobic, rod-shaped and non-motile bacterium from the genus of Niabella which has been isolated from compost.

References

Chitinophagia
Bacteria described in 2019